Dhole Patil College of Engineering, DPCOE, Pune, is an engineering college affiliated to the University of Pune, Pune. NAAC- A+ Grade (3.38CGPA) Established in 2008 by Sagar U. Dhole Patil is a part of Dhole Patil Education Society, DPES. It is the first college in Pune to offer Undergraduate engineering degrees in Automobile Engineering. Located in natural surroundings in Wagholi, its close proximity is to the Kharadi IT Park.

Admission 

Admissions to the institute are done through CAP rounds on JEE-Main scores. It is approved by All India Council for Technical Education (AICTE).

Courses 
DPCOE offers Undergraduate engineering degrees (B.E.), Postgraduate degrees (M.E.) and MBA.

Undergraduate engineering degrees (B.E.) are offered in the following areas:
 Automobile Engineering
 Civil Engineering
 Computer Engineering
 Electronics & Telecommunication Engineering
 Information Technology
 Mechanical Engineering

Postgraduate degrees (M.E.) are offered in the following areas:
 VLSI & Embedded System
 Heat Power
 Machine Design Engineering
 Computer Engineering

M.B.A :
 M.B.A

Training and Placement Cell 

Training is provided to students to enhance soft-skills, group discussion and aptitude test capabilities as well as interview techniques. DPCOE has recorded ample placements in a very short span of time. Dhole Patil College of Engineering is consistently placing its students in core companies. All major and big brands like Amazon, Oracle, Tech Mahindra, Siemens, TCS, Persistent, Cognizant, WNS, MUST Garment, Markets & Markets, Zensar, Opus, ECS, Tieto, Mphasis, NTT Data, IBM are there big recruiters.

See also
List of educational institutions in Pune

Engineering colleges in Pune
Educational institutions established in 2008
2008 establishments in Maharashtra